The 1973 Kerry Senior Football Championship was the 73rd staging of the Kerry Senior Football Championship since its establishment by the Kerry County Board in 1889.

Shannon Rangers entered the championship as the defending champions.

The final was played on 21 October 1973 at Austin Stack Park in Tralee, between Austin Stacks and West Kerry, in what was their first ever meeting in the final. Austin Stacks won the match by 2-08 to 1-06 to claim their sixth championship title overall and a first title in 37 years.

Results

Final

Championship statistics

Miscellaneous

 Austin Stacks win a first title in 37 years.

References

Kerry Senior Football Championship
1973 in Gaelic football